This page lists nationwide public opinion polls that have been conducted relating to the 2023 Czech presidential election. Poll results are listed in the tables below in reverse chronological order, showing the most recent first. The highest percentage figure in each polling survey is displayed in bold, and the background shaded in the leading candidate's colour. In the instance that there is a tie, then no figure is shaded. Poll results use the date the survey's fieldwork was done, as opposed to the date of publication; however, if such date is unknown, the date of publication will be given instead.

Opinion polls for the first round

Since nominations were closed

January—October 2022

2018–2021

Hypothetical polling

Opinion polls for the second round
Babiš vs Pavel

Hypothetical polling 
The polls listed below include candidates who decided not to run, withdrawn from election or failed to advance to second round.

Babiš vs Nerudová

Pavel vs Nerudová

Babiš vs Fischer

Babiš vs Hilšer

Pavel vs Fischer

Nerudová vs Fischer

Babiš vs Středula

Pavel vs Středula

Nerudová vs Středula

Fischer vs Středula

Babiš vs Vystrčil

Babiš vs Němcová

Babiš vs Rakušan

Babiš vs Kalousek

Pavel vs Schillerová

Nerudová vs Schillerová

Pavel vs Stropnický

Středula vs Schillerová

Other polls

Prediction of who would win

References

Opinion polling for presidential elections in the Czech Republic
2023 Czech presidential election